Palička (feminine Paličková) is a Czech surname. Notable people with the surname include:

 Andreas Palicka (born 1986), Swedish handball player
 Vlastimil Palička (born 1954), Czech football manager

Czech-language surnames